A Dark Foe is a 2020 American independent crime-thriller film directed by Maria Gabriela Cardenas and starring her father Oscar Cardenas, Kenzie Dalton, Graham Greene and Selma Blair.

Plot

Cast  
 
 Oscar Cardenas as	Tony Cruz
 Kenzie Dalton as	Rebecca / Lana
 Graham Greene as The Cradle
 Selma Blair as  Dr. Doris Baxter
 Tokala Black Elk 	 as Young Cradle
 Bill Bellamy 	 as Rocco
 Jon Lindstrom as Vincent
 Glenn Morshower 	as Special Agent Stewart
 Julie Gonzalo as Theresa
 Harlow Frances Rocca as Ana
 Shane Almagor as Young Tony
 Trisha Rae Stahl as Onacona
 Monte Markham as Mr. Lorne
 Beverly Todd  as Mildred
 Rebekah Kennedy as Albino Girl
 Duane Whitaker as Bobby
 Ireland Baldwin as  Madeleine

Release
The film had its official premiere at the 2020 Hollywood Reel Independent Film Festival. It was released in selected theaters and on demand on 13 July 2021.

References

External links
 

2020 crime films
2020 thriller films
American independent films
2020 independent films
2020s English-language films
2020s American films